John Henry Patterson may refer to: 

 John Henry Patterson (author) (1867–1947), Anglo-Irish soldier who wrote The Man-Eaters of Tsavo which was made into the film The Ghost and the Darkness in 1996 
 John Henry Patterson (NCR owner) (1844–1922), founder and first owner of the National Cash Register Company
 John Henry Patterson (Medal of Honor) (1843–1920), Union soldier during the American Civil War and recipient of the Medal of Honor

See also
John Patterson (disambiguation)